Joan Herrera may refer to:

 Joan Herrera i Torres (born 1970), Spanish lawyer and politician
 Joan Herrera (footballer) (born 1994), Colombian footballer